Salt Cay is the name of several Caribbean islands:
Salt Cay, Bahamas
Salt Cay, British Virgin Islands
Salt Cay, Turks Islands
Salt Cay Airport
Salt Cay, U.S. Virgin Islands